Leoben/Timmersdorf Airfield is a private use airfield located  west of Timmersdorf, Styria, Austria.

See also
List of airports in Austria

References

External links 
 Airport record for Leoben-Timmersdorf Airport at Landings.com

Airports in Austria
Styria